The Public Health Service Commendation Medal is a decoration of the United States Public Health Service presented to members of the United States Public Health Service Commissioned Officer Corps and to members of any Uniformed Services of the United States who has exhibited a level of proficiency and dedication distinctly greater than that expected
of an officer. It is the eight-highest award awarded by the United States Public Health Service Commissioned Corps.

Criteria
The PHS Commendation Medal is awarded to an officer who has exhibited a level of proficiency and dedication distinctly greater than that expected of an officer. The award recognized sustained high quality achievements in scientific, managerial, or other professional fields; application of unique skill or creative imagination to the approach or solution of problems; or noteworthy technical and professional contributions that are significant to a limited area.

References

See also 
 Public Health Service Distinguished Service Medal
 Public Health Service Meritorious Service Medal

 Public Health Service Achievement Medal
Awards and decorations of the United States Public Health Service